is a Japanese footballer currently playing as a forward for Oita Trinita.

Career statistics

Club
.

Notes

References

External links

2003 births
Living people
People from Nakatsu, Ōita
Association football people from Ōita Prefecture
Japanese footballers
Japan youth international footballers
Association football forwards
J1 League players
Oita Trinita players